Kazakovka is a village in Kurkinsky District of Tula Oblast, Russia.
 Latitude: 53 ° 34'60 North Latitude
 Longitude: 38 ° 22'60 East Longitude
 Height above sea level: 198 m

References

Rural localities in Tula Oblast